Langston Hughes Performing Arts Institute (LHPAI) is a cultural, community, and artistic center in the Central District of Seattle, Washington, USA. It was founded in 1969 and named after the writer and leader of the Harlem Renaissance, Langston Hughes.  It is at 104 17th Avenue South and was built as a synagogue in 1915 designed by Marcus Priteca. He was also the architect of many theaters. It is designated as a Seattle landmark.

The institute has previously been known as Yesler-Atlantic Community Center, the Langston Hughes Cultural Center, The Langston Hughes Cultural Arts Center, and the Langston Hughes Performing Arts Center.

Building history
The Byzantine style synagogue, completed in 1915, was designed by B. Marcus Priteca for the Orthodox Jewish congregation Chevra Bikur Cholim, now Bikur Cholim Machzikay Hadath. Priteca completed his plans for the building in early 1913; the synagogue was dedicated in August 1915. The lower story of the addition on the south side of the building dates from 1961, the upper story from 1971.

The congregation sold the building to the City of Seattle in1969, originally under the Model Cities Program. It became part of Parks and Recreation in 1972. The interior of the auditorium was renovated in 1971: a balcony area was removed, extending auditorium seating further back. In 1991 an addition was made to the east side of the auditorium, as well as seismic retrofit improvements; another addition was made to the southwest corner of the auditorium in 2003. The additions to the building have been for office and support spaces, and to provide barrier-free access.

Organizational history
Langston Hughes Performing Arts Institute was founded in 1969, originally under the Model Cities Program. The city purchased the building in 1971, intending it to house the city's first African-American theater, Black Arts/West, and a minority film training center, Oscar Productions. However, the renovations at that time took so long that those organizations found other quarters. Still, the institute became "Ground Zero" for Seattle's hip hop scene and played a comparable role for local African American theatrical talent.

From its inception into the early 21st century, LHPAI had "a split personality" as a "rec center for neighbor kids and families," strongly associated with Seattle's African American community, [that] also has aspired to be an arts organization, where serious actors, dancers and poets perform and train." Deriving its funds from the city—an unusual situation for a Seattle arts organization—meant it was free of concerns about meeting payroll and paying rent. However, it also led to a mandate that, in the words of former institute coordinator Steve Sneed, could emphasize "arts and crafts, not high-quality arts."

In 2001, the Parks and Recreation gave the institute a mandate to move more strongly toward the latter goal. LHPAI's artistic director, Jacqueline Moscou began an "ambitious" program to train young actors in 2004. Concerns were expressed during the transition that LHPAC might lose its "open-door, neighborhood feel" and that "the African-American focus will be diluted." The latter concern came, in part, because the Parks Department brought in Manuel Cawaling, an Asian American, as the institute's managing director.

Moscou, an African American, was placed on administrative leave in October 2007 after several accusations that she had "made racially offensive and intimidating comments to and about her Asian-American colleagues". She was reinstated at the beginning of March 2008, after a "public outcry."

References

External links
 Langston Hughes Performing Arts Institute, official page
 Performing Arts Center, Langston Hughes African American Film Festival.

Buildings and structures in Seattle
Byzantine Revival synagogues
Central District, Seattle
Former religious buildings and structures in Washington (state)
Former synagogues in the United States
Jews and Judaism in Seattle
Orthodox synagogues in Washington (state)
Performing arts centers in Washington (state)
Synagogues completed in 1915
Theatres in Washington (state)
Tourist attractions in Seattle